Bilnə or Bilna, Bilnya or Bil’nya or Bilinya may refer to:
Bilnə, Yardymli, Azerbaijan
Aşağı Bilnə, Azerbaijan
Yuxarı Bilnə, Azerbaijan